Jade Flowerpots and Bound Feet is a 2001 play by American playwright David Henry Hwang. It deals with a Caucasian woman passing herself off as a minority for a book sell to a major publishing company. The play premiered as part of the production The Square, a night of short plays dealing with Asian American identity conceived by Lisa Peterson and Chay Yew. It started its run on November 5, 2001 at the Joseph Papp Public Theater. It was directed by Peterson.

It is published as part of 2004: The Best Ten-Minute Plays for Two Actors by Smith and Kraus.

References

Plays by David Henry Hwang
2001 plays